The 1964 Men's South American Volleyball Championship, the 6th tournament, took place from 30 March to 8 April 1964 in Buenos Aires, Argentina.

Notes 
Brazil did not compete in 1964 due to political turmoil in the country.

Final positions

References

External links 
 todor66.com

South American Volleyball Championship Men, 1964
Men's South American Volleyball Championships
1964 Volleyball
1964 in South American sport
International volleyball competitions hosted by Argentina
Volleyball
 30-31
 01-08